Roger Segure  (May 22, 1905 – January 28, 2000) was an American jazz arranger and songwriter.

He was born in Brooklyn, New York. Segure was primarily an autodidact. In the 1930's, he managed singer Midge Williams and provided piano accompaniment for her tours of the United States and East Asia. He penned several songs for Williams with writer Langston Hughes. Later in the 1930's he did arrangements for Louis Armstrong, Andy Kirk, and John Kirby. From 1940 to 1942, he was an arranger for Jimmie Lunceford. Segure penned the score for Lunceford for the film, Blues in the Night. He moved to Los Angeles, California, in the 1940s, where he worked as a musical director for television and in music education.  Segure also helped integrate the Los Angeles chapters of the American Federation of Musicians.

References

Further reading
Leonard Feather, The Encyclopedia of Jazz, 1955
"Roger Segure". Grove Jazz online.

1905 births
2000 deaths
American jazz pianists
American male pianists
American music arrangers
Musicians from New York (state)
20th-century American pianists
20th-century American male musicians
American male jazz musicians